Attarsuiya is a locality (township) of Allahabad, Uttar Pradesh, India. Attarsuiya is just 2 km away from Railway station. Nearby localities are Rani Mandi, Atala & Meerapur. Attarsuiya is named after scholar Atri and his wife Anasuya.

References 

Neighbourhoods in Allahabad